Andreas Fuhrer (born 21 May 1959) is a retired Swiss sidecarcross rider and four times World Champion.

He has also won the Swiss national sidecarcross championship five times, in 1989 and from 1993 to 1996. After his last world championship in 1996, he retired from the sport.

Biography
Fuhrer grew up in Seedorf and is a trained mechanic. He started racing sidecarcross in 1981 and qualified for the world championship for the first time in 1985, racing for the Moto-Club Aarberg.

From 1985 to 1996, he raced in the world championship. Fuhrer earned his first podium in 1987 with passenger Hans Rudolf Stettler. In 1990, he achieved his first race win, at the Swiss GP. After Adrian Käser joined him as a passenger for the 1993 season, the team's fortunes improved dramatically, earning 22 race victories and four world championships together.

Fuhrer retired from the sport in 1996 for mostly financial reasons, finding it difficult to market sidecarcross in comparison to single-rider motocross. He also wished to leave the sport at the height of his career. He stayed away from racing for two years before taking up motocross again, this time in the solo class.

Andreas Fuhrer is married and has three children. He works and lives in Aarberg, where he owns a Kawasaki motocross motorcycle dealership, originally having worked in the local sugar factory.

Sidecarcross world championship results

Season by season

Source:

Honours

World Championship
 Champions: (4) 1993, 1994, 1995, 1996

Switzerland
 Champions: (5) 1989, 1993, 1994, 1995, 1996

References

External links
 Andreas Fuhrer homepage
 The World Championship on Sidecarcross.com

1959 births
Living people
Swiss sidecarcross riders
Sportspeople from the canton of Bern
People from Aarberg